Homelessness in New Zealand has been linked to the general issue of lack of suitable housing. The homeless population is generally measured through the country's census and by universities and other academic centres. In 2009, urban homelessness (rough sleepers or improvised dwellings) were estimated at less than 300, while rural homelessness (improvised dwellings) was estimated between 500 and 1000. An additional 8,000–20,000 live in "temporary accommodation unsuited for long-term habitation (caravans, campgrounds, substandard housing and boarding houses)."  Homelessness in New Zealand has traditionally been reduced by the provision of state housing, similar to Germany and other developed countries.

Definitions and services
Statistical authorities in New Zealand have expanded their definition of homelessness to include ‘people living in improvised shelters’, ‘people staying in camping grounds/motor camps’ and ‘people sharing accommodation with someone else’s household’. Services representing the sector include the New Zealand Coalition to End Homelessness (NZCEH).

History
The issue is believed to have become increasingly visible in recent years. Media in New Zealand have published an accusatory account of the presence of homeless people in public spaces, positioning homeless men as disruptive threats. Though community members have shown support though writing opinion pieces.

In late January 2019, the New York Times reported rising housing prices to be a major factor in the increasing homelessness in New Zealand so that "smaller markets like Tauranga, a coastal city on the North Island with a population of 128,000, had seen an influx of people who had left Auckland in search of more affordable housing. Average property values in Tauranga had risen to $497,000 from $304,000 in the last five years, and Demographia now rated it among the 10 least affordable cities in the world — along with famously expensive locales such as Hong Kong, San Francisco, Sydney and Vancouver, British Columbia."

In mid August 2019, the Associate Housing Minister Kris Faafoi and Social Development Minister Carmel Sepuloni announced that the Government would be launching a NZ$54 million program to tackle homelessness in New Zealand. This includes investing $31 million over the next four years for 67 intensive case managers and navigators to work with homeless people and a further $16 million for the Sustaining Tenancies Programme. This funding complements the Government's Housing First programme.

See also
Homelessness in Australia
Housing in New Zealand

References

New Zealand
Poverty in New Zealand
Housing in New Zealand